Treharne is a surname. Notable people with the surname include:

 Colin Treharne (born 1937), Welsh footballer
 Edward Treharne (1862–1904), Welsh rugby union footballer
 Elaine Treharne (born 1964), Welsh medievalist
 Llewellyn Treharne, Welsh rugby union and rugby league footballer
 Trevor Treharne, Australian sports journalist